The Henley Beach railway line is a defunct railway in western Adelaide, which operated from 1894 to 1957 as the final section of the Grange railway line.

History 
The line opened on 5 February 1894 as an extension of the Grange line and originally serviced five stations. The line was originally taken over and extended partly to allow for military manoeuvres as part of "the Russian Scare" and as a reaction to the Jervois-Scratchley reports, which also saw the building of Fort Glanville and Fort Largs to protect South Australian shipping around the same time.

The line appears to have been 5 stations at some early time: Grange, Kirkaldy, Marlborough Street, "Henley Beach Jetty Road", and Henley Beach. Sometime prior to 1940 (perhaps as early as 31 October 1913), the terminus station Henley Beach station was closed, with the "Jetty Road" station becoming the terminus and being renamed Henley Beach, resulting in 4 stations on the line.

The line closed on 31 August 1957 due to the track being close to public roads with no fencing between. The line was cut back to the now defunct original Grange station, which was cut even further back to the current Grange station in the 1986 by removal of tracks across Military Road and infrastructure from the original platform. The unused platform still remains on the side of the road.

Line guide

References 

 

Closed railway lines in South Australia
Railway lines opened in 1894
Railway lines closed in 1957